Chilton Trinity is a village and civil parish on the River Parrett,  north of Bridgwater in the Sedgemoor district of Somerset, England.

History

Iron Age and Roman pottery have been found at Chilton village. The name Chilton implies a settlement for younger sons.

At one time Chilton Trinity was part of the hundred of Andersfield, but in another era it was part of the hundred of Cannington.

Governance

The parish council has responsibility for local issues, including setting an annual precept (local rate) to cover the council's operating costs and producing annual accounts for public scrutiny. The parish council evaluates local planning applications and works with the local police, district council officers, and neighbourhood watch groups on matters of crime, security, and traffic. The parish council's role also includes initiating projects for the maintenance and repair of parish facilities, as well as consulting with the district council on the maintenance, repair, and improvement of highways, drainage, footpaths, public transport, and street cleaning. Conservation matters (including trees and listed buildings) and environmental issues are also the responsibility of the council.

The village falls within the Non-metropolitan district of Sedgemoor, which was formed on 1 April 1974 under the Local Government Act 1972, having previously been part of Bridgwater Rural District, which is responsible for local planning and building control, local roads, council housing, environmental health, markets and fairs, refuse collection and recycling, cemeteries and crematoria, leisure services, parks, and tourism.

Somerset County Council is responsible for running the largest and most expensive local services such as education, social services, libraries, main roads, public transport, policing and fire services, trading standards, waste disposal and strategic planning.

It is also part of the Bridgwater and West Somerset county constituency represented in the House of Commons of the Parliament of the United Kingdom. It elects one Member of Parliament (MP) by the first past the post system of election, and was part of the South West England constituency of the European Parliament prior to Britain leaving the European Union in January 2020, which elected seven MEPs using the d'Hondt method of party-list proportional representation.

Education

The village is home to Chilton Trinity School a specialist technology college for pupils aged 11–16.

Religious sites

The Church of the Holy Trinity was established in the 13th century, but the current building dates from the 15th century with 19th-century renovation and has been designated by English Heritage as a grade II* listed building.

References

External links

 Chilton Trinity: Manors and other estates from British History Online

Villages in Sedgemoor
Somerset Levels
Civil parishes in Somerset